Hermann Kober (born 1 February 1888 in Beuthen,  Germany (now Bytom, Poland), died 4 October 1973 in Birmingham, England) was a Jewish-German mathematician who introduced Erdélyi–Kober operators.
He taught (mathematics and science), up to the early 1960s, at some of the King Edward VI Foundation schools in Birmingham.

References

1888 births
1973 deaths
19th-century German Jews
20th-century German mathematicians
People from Bytom
People from the Province of Silesia
German emigrants to the United Kingdom